Motonobu Miyamura (born 1 December 1936) is a Japanese water polo player. He competed in the men's tournament at the 1960 Summer Olympics.

References

External links
 

1936 births
Living people
Japanese male water polo players
Olympic water polo players of Japan
Water polo players at the 1960 Summer Olympics
Sportspeople from Kumamoto Prefecture
Asian Games medalists in water polo
Water polo players at the 1958 Asian Games
Asian Games gold medalists for Japan
Medalists at the 1958 Asian Games
20th-century Japanese people